Catharina Pieternella "Ella" Vogelaar (23 December 1949 – 7 October 2019) was a Dutch politician of the Labour Party (PvdA) and trade union leader.

Political career
After graduating from the HBS in Zierikzee she attended the social academy in Driebergen between 1967 and 1972. During that period, Vogelaar was an active member of the Communist Party of the Netherlands (CPN). In 1972 she began to work as a youth worker. In the mid 1980s she began to work for the Education Trade Union and she began to study education studies at the University of Amsterdam specialising in education policy and law. In 1987 she graduated from the University of Amsterdam and in 1988 she became chair of the Trade Union for Education. During her tenure as chair, she prepared the merger between the social-democratic ABOP education trade union and the liberal NGLOA education trade union. In 1994 she became vice-chair of the Federation Dutch Labour Movement, as such she was member of the Social Economic Council and the Foundation of Labour. Between 1997 and 2000 she was project manager at the Ministry of Social Affairs and Employment. Since 2000 Vogelaar worked as an independent advisor and interim-manager, as such she has coordinated the projected Integration Task Force at the Ministry of the Interior and Kingdom Relations. She advised governments, organisations and companies on employment policy, social security, education and integration. She was also part of the board of VNO-NCW, the largest Dutch employers' federation.

She was part of the advisory board and the board of directors of several companies, including the Amsterdam Municipal Transport Agency, the Harbour of Rotterdam and Unilever. She served on the board of the Nederlands-Vlaamse Accreditatie Organisatie, which inspects the quality of Dutch and Flemish universities and on the board of the Dutch Center for Foreigners. From 2004 through 2007, she was chair of Oxfam Novib, the largest Dutch international development organization.

On 13 November 2008 she resigned as Minister of Integration and Housing after the party leadership removed their confidence for her position after increasing criticism of her media performance. An example of this was her performance in a video by the blog GeenStijl in which their reporter Rutger Castricum asked her critical questions about reports that she had hired a spin doctor.

Death
On 7 October 2019, Vogelaar died at the age of 69. She committed suicide after struggling with depression.

Decorations

References

External links

Official
  Drs. C.P. (Ella) Vogelaar Parlement & Politiek

1949 births
2019 deaths
Dutch corporate directors
Dutch nonprofit directors
Dutch politicians who committed suicide
Dutch political commentators
Dutch political writers
Dutch social workers
Dutch trade union leaders
Labour Party (Netherlands) politicians
Ministers without portfolio of the Netherlands
People from Steenbergen
Suicides in the Netherlands
University of Amsterdam alumni
Women government ministers of the Netherlands
20th-century Dutch civil servants
21st-century Dutch civil servants
21st-century Dutch women politicians
21st-century Dutch politicians
21st-century Dutch women writers
2019 suicides
20th-century Dutch women